Football at the 1974 Asian Games was held in Tehran, Iran from 2 to 15 September 1974.

Venues

Medalists

Draw
The draw was held few days before the event.

Group A
 
 
 
 *

Group B
 
 
 
 

Group C
 
 
 
 

Group D
 
 
 

* Bahrain later transferred to Group D.

Squads

Results

Preliminary round

Group A

Group B

Group C

Group D

Second round

Group A

Group B

Final round

Bronze medal match

Final

References 
 "Asian Games 1974", RSSSF.
 Japan Results
 Israel Results

 
1974 Asian Games events
1974
Asia Games
1974 Asian Games
Asian